Mavis Taylor (1914 – 17 March 2007) was an Australian who was named an Australian Living Treasure for her humanitarian work for the people of East Timor in her later years.

Life
Mrs Taylor was born in Richmond, Victoria in 1914

At 16 she moved to Yarrawonga in Victoria, Australia.  In Yarrawonga, she married Thomas William Lloyd Taylor (born Yarrawonga 1913), raised 9 children, and established a clothesmaking and haberdashery business.

Humanitarian work for East Timor
She started collecting and sending household items to East Timor after seeing violence during the difficult period of move to independence. By 2004 she had personally organised 21 shipping containers of practical aid, including stock from her own business and had set up 23 sewing centres providing employment for East Timorese with major funding she provided.

Awards 
Taylor was inducted onto the Victorian Honour Roll of Women in 2003.

References

External links
Australia's Living National Treasures
Mavis goes to Timor United Nations Conference on Ageing publication (in Spanish)

People from Victoria (Australia)
People from Richmond, Tasmania
1915 births
2007 deaths
Australian humanitarians
Women humanitarians